At least two warships of Japan have borne the name Ise:

 , a battleship of the Imperial Japanese Navy, named after the province
 , a Japanese helicopter carrier, also named after the province

Japanese Navy ship names